Fraas's lizard (Parvilacerta fraasii) is a species of lizard in the family Lacertidae. It is endemic to Western Asia.

Etymology
The specific name, fraasii, is in honor of German paleontologist Eberhard Fraas.

Geographic range
P. fraasii is found in Lebanon and possibly Syria.

Habitat
The natural habitat of P. fraasii is rocky areas.

Conservation status
P. fraasii is threatened by habitat loss.

References

Further reading
Lehrs P. (1910). "Über eine Lacerta aus dem hohen Libanon ( L. fraasii n. sp. ) und andere Montanformen unter der Eidechsen ". pp. 225–238. In: Anonymous (1910). Festschrift zum sechzigten Geburtstag Richard Hertwigs (München), gebornen den 23. September 1850 zu Friedberg i. H., Zweiter Band [Volume 2]. Jena, Germany: G. Fischer. (Lacerta fraasii, new species, p. 228). (in German).

Parvilacerta
Reptiles described in 1910
Taxa named by Philipp Lehrs
Taxonomy articles created by Polbot